Kotulpur is a village in the Kotulpur CD block in the Bishnupur subdivision of the Bankura district  in the state of West Bengal, India.

Etymology
Kotlu Khan of Gar Mandaran, then capital of the local kingdom, was killed in a war, in the Mughal era. Kotulpur was named after him.

Geography

Location
Kotulpur is located at

Area overview
The map alongside shows the Bishnupur subdivision of Bankura district. Physiographically, this area has fertile low lying alluvial plains. It is a predominantly rural area with 90.06% of the population living in rural areas and only 8.94% living in the urban areas. It was a part of the core area of Mallabhum.

Note: The map alongside presents some of the notable locations in the subdivision. All places marked in the map are linked in the larger full screen map.

Demographics
According to 2011 Census of India, Kotulpur had a total population of 8,483, of which 4,280 (50%) were males and 4,203 (50%) were females. Population below 6 years was 759. The total number of literates in Kotulpur was 6,653 (86.13% of the population over 6 years).

Civic administration

Police station
Kotulpur police station has jurisdiction over Kotulpur  CD block. The area covered is 250.50 km2 with a population of 167,547.

CD block HQ
The headquarters of Kotulpur CD block are located at Kotulpur.

Infrastructure
According to the District Census Handbook 2011, Bankura, Kotulpur covered an area of 5.6454 km2. Among the civic amenities, the protected water supply involved tap water from un-treated sources, hand pumps. It had 790 domestic electric connections. Among the medical facilities it had 1 hospital, 11 medicine shops. Among the educational facilities it had were 7 primary schools, 2 middle schools, 2 secondary schools, 2 senior secondary schools, the nearest general degree college at Chatra 13 km away.

Transport
State Highway 2 running from Khatra to Malancha (in North 24 Parganas district) passes through Kotulpur. A well connected bus services available from Kotulpur. Various long-distance bus routes like Tarakeswar - Bankura, Tarakeswar - Khatra, Arambagh - Purulia, Kolkata - Bishnupur, Chuchura - Bankura, Kotulpur - Durgapur, Kotulpur - Namkhana etc. present now, beside this local busses available for Jairambati, Indas, Arambagh, Kamarpukur, Bishnupur, Badanganj etc.

Education
Kotulpur High School is a Bengali-medium coeducational institution established in 1891. It has facilities for teaching from class V to class XII. The school has 12 computers, a library with 1,000 books and a playground.

Kotulpur Sarojbasini Balika Vidyalaya is a Bengali-medium coeducational institution established in 1965. It has facilities for teaching from class V to class XII. The school has 5 computers, a library with 2,350 books and a playground.

Chatra Ramai Pandit Mahavidyalaya, was established at Chatra, PO Darapur in 2000.

Healthcare
Kotulpur Rural Hospital, with 60 beds at Kotulpur, is the major government medical facility in the Kotulpur CD block. There are primary health centres at Gopinathpur (with 6 beds), Lego (with 10 beds), Laugram Karakheria (with 10 beds), Sihar (with 10 beds), Mirjapur (with 4 beds) and Deshra (Deopara) (with 10 beds). also a multi-speciality hospital is located inside this town.

References

Cities and towns in Bankura district